Xaçmaz or Khachmaz may refer to:
 Khachmaz Rayon, Azerbaijan
 Khachmaz (city), Azerbaijan
 Xaçmaz, Oghuz, Azerbaijan